This is a List of Honorary Fellows of University College, Oxford.

 John Albery
 Charles Bathurst, 1st Viscount Bledisloe
 William Beveridge
 E. J. Bowen
 Robin Butler, Baron Butler of Brockwell
 Philip Christison
 Derman Christopherson
 Bill Clinton
 Frederick Cockin
 C. H. Dodd
 E. R. Dodds
 Sir David Edward
 John Robert Evans
 A. D. Gardner
 Guy Garrod
 H. L. A. Hart
 Bob Hawke
 Stephen Hawking
 Leonard Hoffmann, Baron Hoffmann
 C. S. Lewis
 Rudolph A. Marcus
 Festus Mogae
 Sir Andrew Motion
 Sir V.S. Naipaul
 Patrick Nairne
 Ronald Oxburgh, Baron Oxburgh
Christopher Pelling
 Prince Philip, Duke of Edinburgh
 John Erskine Read
 John Redcliffe-Maud, Baron Redcliffe-Maud
 David Renton, Baron Renton
 Bernard W. Rogers
 Sir Maurice Shock
 Herwald Ramsbotham, 1st Viscount Soulbury
 Stephen Spender
 Johan Steyn, Baron Steyn
 P. F. Strawson
 Philip Cunliffe-Lister, 1st Earl of Swinton
 Tim Tacchi
 John Taylor
 Edward Maunde Thompson
 Travers Twiss
 Kenneth Wheare
 John Wild
 Harold Wilson
 Derek Wood

See also

 :Category:Alumni of University College, Oxford
 :Category:Fellows of University College, Oxford

University College, Oxford
Honorary
University